Halbe may refer to:

People
 Dhanashree Halbe (born 1928), Marathi writer and translator
 Erna Halbe, married name of Erna Lang (1892-1983), German activist
 Halbe Zijlstra (born 1969), Dutch politician
 Max Halbe (1865–1944), German dramatist

Places
 Halbe, Brandenburg, Germany

Other
 Battle of Halbe